Hotpoint is a British brand of domestic appliances. Ownership of the brand is split between American company Whirlpool, which has the rights in Europe, and Chinese company Haier, which has the rights in the Americas through its purchase of GE Appliances in 2016.

History

Pacific Electric Heating Company 
The company name Hotpoint comes from the hot point of the innovative first electric iron.  Invented by American, Earl Richardson (1871–1934) in 1905, he subsequently formed his 'Pacific Electric Heating Company' in Ontario, California, in 1906. The device became known as the Hotpoint iron, with its hottest point at the front and not the center.

Hotpoint 
Hotpoint was founded in 1911 by Earl Richardson.

Hotpoint Electric Heating Company 
In 1912, the company began making electric irons, and in 1919, electric cookers in the United States. Earl Richardson also invented the first iron that switched off automatically when a maximum temperature was reached.

It is claimed to have developed one of the earliest electric toasters in 1908, known as the El Tosto, and later, under GE, the Hotpoint brand name became one of the most popular brands of toaster in the United States in the 1920s and 1930s. Richardson founded his own settlement, Adelanto, California, in 1915.

Edison Electric Appliance Company 
In 1918, the company, known as the Hotpoint Electric Heating Company' , merged with the Heating Device Section of General Electric, becoming the 'Edison Electric Appliance Company'.

 Hotpoint Electric Appliance Company 
In 1920, it established a joint venture with competitor General Electric, forming the '''Hotpoint Electric Appliance Company' Limited (HEAC) to market GE (USA) branded goods in the United Kingdom.

 Edison General Electric Company 
In 1927, GE bought the factory and entire company. It became known as the Edison General Electric Company' in 1931.

Most Hotpoint production moved to GE's mammoth Appliance Park manufacturing complex in Louisville, KY in the beginning of the 1950s. To this day, many Hotpoint appliances are made at Louisville, the largest appliance plant in the world.

GEC
In 1929, HEAC joined the Associated Electrical Industries (AEI) group, itself bought by The General Electric Company in 1967. By the 1960s it was the market leader in household electrical appliances in the United Kingdom, followed by Sweden's Electrolux.

 GDA 
Hotpoint continued as a subsidiary of GEC until 1989, when it was merged into a new division of GEC called General Domestic Appliances (GDA).  50% of GDA was purchased by General Electric (USA), with whom it owned the joint venture. In 1998, the Redring and Xpelair brands also joined GDA, and Hotpoint was categorized as part of GDA Applied Energy.

Indesit
GEC was restructured into Marconi plc. from which Indesit Company (then called Merloni Elettrodomestici) took over and then Indesit was bought out by Hotpoint on 21 December 2001 for £121m.  At this point, Hotpoint employed around 7,000 people at its four sites in the United Kingdom, three of which later closed. Indesit UK has been based at Hotpoint headquarters in Peterborough since 1 June 2003.
In 2005, Merloni Elettrodomestici rebranded to become Indesit Company.

At the beginning of 2007, Indesit Company launched the group's new brand architecture, Hotpoint, and combined with Ariston to form the Hotpoint-Ariston brand.
 
In December 2008, Indesit Company acquired the final quota of shares from General Electric for US$57m. From the end of 2011, Indesit rolled out the Hotpoint brand name across Europe, replacing the names Ariston and Hotpoint Ariston.

 Whirlpool 
In October 2014,  Whirlpool's had a turbulent ownership of Indesit Company as in 2015, Indesit Company released a statement announcing a safety alert for certain models of tumble dryers produced between 2004 to 2015 due to a design flaw which caused large particles of lint to escape the fluff filter into the dryer and build up around the heating element bank which posed a risk of fire. In 2016, Whirlpool began sending out engineers to perform safety modifications to the recalled dryers. In July 2019, Whirlpool finally issued a recall for the appliances and that up to 800,000 machines will either be replaced or repaired.

In December 2019, Whirlpool announced a safety recall for certain models of Hotpoint and Indesit washing machines manufactured between 2014 and 2018, due to faulty door interlocks which could potentially cause the machines to catch fire.

 Haier 
In September 2014, Electrolux agreed to buy General Electric's household appliances business including the Hotpoint brand in North America for £2bn ($3.3bn). The deal was expected to close in 2015.  Due to blockage by U.S. regulators, the Electrolux deal was terminated, and GE subsequently sold its appliance division to Haier of China, to close in 2016.

Products
Hotpoint was formed in 1911 in California and entered the British market in 1920. It is well known for its refrigerators and washing machines. The company, including sister brands Creda and Indesit, at one time produced the largest amount of kitchen appliances in the United Kingdom. The headquarters was in Woodston, Peterborough with about 1,500 people based there making fridges and freezers. The refrigeration plant closed in 2008.

Grenfell Tower fire
In June 2017, a Hotpoint FF175BP fridge freezer was found to have triggered the Grenfell Tower fire in London that killed 72 people. A total of 64,000 units of the same model were manufactured between 2006 and 2009 by Indesit under the Hotpoint brand before moving over to Whirlpool.

Customers who believed they own either the FF175BP or the FF175BG models have been advised to contact the company for further safety checks. According to the Hotpoint website: “We have been made aware that the recent fire at Grenfell Tower in West London may have originated in a Hotpoint branded fridge freezer, manufactured between March 2006 and July 2009, model numbers FF175BP (white) and FF175BG (graphite)".

In October 2018, Whirlpool notified customers that they did not find anything that posed a risk to the customers, and that the London Fire Brigade’s investigation into the cause of the fire had found that some electrical cabling behind the fridge freezer, or an incorrectly discarded cigarette on the kitchen window may have started the fire.

Manufacturing sites
The former Hotpoint plant in Yate that makes tumble dryers, is now the only plant in the United Kingdom still in operation. Most machines are now made in Italy and Poland as opposed to the United Kingdom. Hotpoint washing machines  were formerly manufactured at a plant in Llandudno Junction, in Conwy County Borough, North Wales, United Kingdom. The site made around 800,000 washing machines in 2007, with about 1,000 employees. It is now the North Wales base of the Senedd.

Their refrigeration products, formerly manufactured at the Peterborough factory, now are made in Poland. It has a distribution centre at Raunds.

Site closures
Indesit UK's (former GDA) Creda plant in Blythe Bridge, Stoke-on-Trent closed in December 2007. Closure of the manufacturing facilities at Peterborough followed in the end of 2008.  On 31 July 2009, Indesit closed its plant at Kinmel Park, Bodelwyddan Denbighshire, Wales, United Kingdom.

The factory employed 305 workers. The company blamed "continuing decline" in the market.

United States
In the United States, Hotpoint branded products are made by GE Consumer & Industrial (appliance business to be acquired by Haier in 2016) at Louisville, Kentucky.

Marketing
In 2002, it had a 23% share of the white goods market in the United Kingdom. The Holby City actress Lisa Faulkner starred in their 2010 Campaign for Cooking Confidence.

In 2009, it worked with Kelly Hoppen to produce its interior design Hot Style'' campaign. The company has also worked in conjunction with the P&G detergent brand Ariel. It currently recommends Ariel. Before 2004, Hotpoint recommended Unilever brands; Persil & Comfort. In the past it has also recommended Glist dishwasher tablets.

Actress Mary Tyler Moore appeared in a series of 1950s television commercials for the company as a character called "Happy Hotpoint", prior to her fame in television comedy series during the next two decades.

References

External links
 Official website (Americas)
 Official website (Europe) 
 Official website (UK)

News items
 Closing Peterborough fridge plant in May 2008
 Welsh factory in December 2007

Video clips
 Hotpoint YouTube channel
 Many Hotpoint videos
 Aquarius Ultra Persil advert

General Electric Company
Haier
Indesit Company
Companies based in Peterborough
Electronics companies established in 1911
Home appliance brands
Home appliance manufacturers of the United Kingdom
1911 establishments in California